The 2020–21 season is Stevenage's seventh consecutive season in League Two and their 45th year in existence. Along with competing in League Two, the club participated in the FA Cup, EFL Cup and EFL Trophy.

The club were in last place of League Two when the 2019–20 season was suspended due to the COVID-19 pandemic in March 2020. EFL clubs formally agreed to end the season during an EFL meeting on 9 June 2020, although "ongoing disciplinary matters" involving 23rd-placed Macclesfield Town, who had not paid their players on six separate occasions during the season, meant Stevenage might be reprieved. Stevenage were initially relegated from League Two after an independent disciplinary panel opted to deduct Macclesfield two points on 19 June, with a further four suspended, the maximum number they could deduct without relegating them. The EFL stated it would appeal against the independent disciplinary panel's sanctions on Macclesfield, winning their appeal against the points deduction on 11 August. This meant that the four suspended points were activated immediately and applied to the 2019–20 season, meaning Stevenage finished in 23rd-place and consequently retained their League Two status.

Stevenage's struggles continued into the 2020–21 season as the team were in last place with only two wins in their first 18 matches. However, from Boxing Day on, the club won 10 matches, drew nine times and only lost five games, finishing in 14th place in the league table.

Transfers

Transfers in

Loans in

Loans out

Transfers out

Pre-season

Competitions

League Two

League table

Results summary

Results by matchday

Matches
The 2020–21 season fixtures were released on 21 August.

FA Cup

The draw for the first round was made on Monday 26, October. The second round draw was revealed on Monday, 9 November by Danny Cowley. The third round draw was made on 30 November, with Premier League and EFL Championship clubs all entering the competition.

EFL Cup

The first round draw was made on 18 August, live on Sky Sports, by Paul Merson.

EFL Trophy

The regional group stage draw was confirmed on 18 August.

Statistics

Appearances and goals

Last updated 11 May 2021.

|-
! colspan=14 style=background:#dcdcdc; text-align:center| Goalkeepers

|-

! colspan=14 style=background:#dcdcdc; text-align:center| Defenders

|-

! colspan=14 style=background:#dcdcdc; text-align:center| Midfielders

|-

! colspan=14 style=background:#dcdcdc; text-align:center| Forwards

|}

Top scorers
Includes all competitive matches. The list is sorted by squad number when total goals are equal.

Last updated 11 May 2021.

Clean sheets
Includes all competitive matches. The list is sorted by squad number when total clean sheets are equal.

Last updated 11 May 2021.

Disciplinary record
Includes all competitive matches.

Last updated 11 May 2021.

Notes

References

Stevenage
Stevenage F.C. seasons